American High School is a 2009 American direct-to-DVD coming-of-age romantic comedy film written and directed by Sean Patrick Cannon and starring Jillian Murray, Aubrey O'Day, Talan Torriero and Martin Klebba. It was released on April 7, 2009, in the United States. Trini Lopez makes a guest appearance as the performer at the Prom.

Plot
It is the final week of senior year at American High School and Gwen Adams considers divorcing her new husband Holden Adams, whom she married because her rival Hilary Weiss is also trying to be his girlfriend. She faces the problems created by Hilary's plot to become prom queen and decides to run for prom queen herself. The married couple are caught having sex by Principal Mann. The principal faces forced resignation and hatches a plan with Gwen, another teacher and some other students, to get her job back from Ms. Apple. She is later crowned Prom Queen (albeit by shredding Hilary's votes earlier), she dumps her husband and decides she is leaving town and so is now finally free of Hilary. As the film ends, Hilary is shown getting rejected by the male students because of her promiscuous behavior.

Cast
 Jillian Murray as Gwen Adams
 Talan Torriero as Holden Adams
 Aubrey O'Day as Hilary Weiss
 Martin Klebba as Principal Mann
 Nikki Schieler Ziering as Ms. Apple
 Brian Drolet as Jonny Awesome
 Alex Murrel as Dixie
 Pat Jankiewicz as Mr. Seuss
 Hoyt Richards as Kip Dick
 Ashley Ann Cook as Zoey
 James E. Foley as Matt Mysterio
 Davida Williams as Trixie
 Maxie J. Santillan Jr. as Tee-Pee
 Cameron Goodman as Jo Awesome
 Madison Dylan as Candi

References

External links
 

2000s coming-of-age films
2000s high school films
2009 romantic comedy films
2000s sex comedy films
2000s teen comedy films
2000s teen romance films
2009 direct-to-video films
2009 films
American coming-of-age films
American high school films
American romantic comedy films
American sex comedy films
American teen comedy films
American teen romance films
Coming-of-age comedy films
Coming-of-age romance films
Direct-to-video comedy films
2000s English-language films
Films shot in Los Angeles County, California
Films about proms
2000s American films